The USATF New York Grand Prix is an annual athletics meeting held at Icahn Stadium in New York City, United States. First started in 2005 as the Reebok Grand Prix and then Adidas Grand Prix, it was previously one of the IAAF Grand Prix events. It was part of the Diamond League competition through 2015. The IAAF announced on March 3, 2016, that New York would be replaced immediately by Rabat, Morocco, on the Diamond League tour. Local organizers the same day said they would announce plans to carry on the meet as a street event in New York. The meeting was eventually replaced in 2016 by the Adidas Boost Boston Games. The meet returned in 2022 under its current name after a six year hiatus as a Continental Tour Gold meet.

World records
Over the course of its history, two world records have been set at the Adidas Grand Prix.

Meeting records

Men

Women

References

External links 
 Diamond League – New York Official Web Site 

2005 establishments in New York City
2005 in sports in New York City
2016 disestablishments in New York (state)
2016 in sports in New York City
2000s in Manhattan
2010s in Manhattan
Diamond League
IAAF Grand Prix
Randalls and Wards Islands
Recurring sporting events disestablished in 2016
Recurring sporting events established in 2005
Sports competitions in New York City
Track and field competitions in the United States
Track and field in New York City